The 1954–55 Maccabi Petah Tikva season was the club's 44th season since its establishment in 1912, and 7th since the establishment of the State of Israel.

During the season, the club competed in Liga Alef (top division) and the State Cup. In addition, the team took part, along with Hapoel Petah Tikva, on a tour to Cyprus.

Review and events
On 24 September 1954 a team of players from both Hapoel Petah Tikva and Maccabi Petah Tikva departed for a tour of Cyprus, without the consent of the IFA. The Hapoel organization sent a telegram forbidding the participation of Hapoel players in any match, and the team played as Maccabi Petah Tikva.After returning to Israel, Maccabi Petah Tikva was banned for 6 months for its part of the tour, while Hapoel Petah Tikva received a fine of 50 pounds. As a result of the ban, the entire squad of the club was transferred to Maccabi Ein Ganim, which played several friendly matches until the ban was lifted as part of a general pardon given by the IFA in December and the club reverted to its name.
On 10 January 1955, the IFA ordered to replay a match from the previous season between Maccabi Haifa and Maccabi Petah Tikva. The Original match, which was played on 26 December 1953 and ended with a 3–2 win for Haifa, was claimed to be fixed, to allow Maccabi Haifa to win. Maccabi Haifa won the rematch 4–1.
 Petah Tikva XI, a team composed of players from Hapoel Petah Tikva and Maccabi Petah Tikva played three matches against visiting foreign teams: Against Beşiktaş on 20 September 1954, losing 0–2, against Udarnik Sofia on 16 October 1954, losing 2–3, and against AC Omonia on 27 May 1955, winning 4–1.

Match Results

Legend

Liga Alef

League matches began on 6 February 1955, and by the time the season, only 20 rounds of matches were completed, delaying the end of the league season to the next season.

League table (as of 2 July 1955)

Source:

Matches

1953–54 Liga Alef

1954–55 Liga Alef

Results by match

State Cup

References

 

Maccabi Petah Tikva F.C. seasons
Maccabi Petah Tikva